César Castellanos Domínguez is a Protestant Shepherd, founder of the International Charismatic Mission in 1983, since when he has been its general Shepherd. Creator of the G12 Vision movement. In 1998 he was elected Representative to the Chamber for Bogotá. Husband of Colombian Senator Emma Claudia Castellanos, and father of Bogotá Councilor Sara Castellanos.

Vision G12 
Castellanos traveled to South Korea in 1986, where he was impressed by the success of the cell strategy used at the Yoido Full Gospel Church, led by Pastor David Yonggi Cho. Castellanos applied this strategy in his own church, giving it significance for Christians by the use of the number twelve, recalling the Apostles. The strategy had an effect, managing to have 18 headquarters around Colombia and be present in countries such as the United States, Mexico, Chile, Brazil, Peru, Ecuador , Bolivia, Venezuela, Costa Rica and Argentina in America; Switzerland, Spain, the United Kingdom and France in Europe; Philippines, South Korea and Russia in Asia; and South Africa.

Political career 
Castellanos was elected as Representative to the Chamber for Bogotá, with the endorsement of the National Christian Party, and was part of the Third Commission of said Chamber. Castellanos was the victim of an attempt on his life in 1997.

References

Colombian clergy
Charismatics pastors
Year of birth missing (living people)
Living people
Colombian evangelicals